Oscar Phillip Celestin (January 1, 1884 – December 15, 1954) better known by stage name Papa Celestin was an American jazz trumpeter and bandleader.

Life and career

Celestin was born in Napoleonville, Louisiana, to a Creole family, son of a sugar-cane cutter. In his youth he worked on rural Louisiana plantations. Eager for a better life, he worked as a cook for the Texas and Pacific Railway, saved up money and bought used musical instruments. He played guitar and trombone before deciding on cornet as his main instrument. He took music lessons from Claiborne Williams, who traveled down the Bayou Lafourche from Donaldsonville. He played with the Algiers Brass Band by the early 1900s, and with various small town bands before moving to New Orleans in 1904, at age 20.

In New Orleans, he played with the Imperial, Indiana, Henry Allen senior's Olympia Brass Band, and Jack Carey's dance band; early in his career he was sometimes known as "Sonny" Celestin. About 1910, he gained a job as leader of the house band at the Tuxedo Dance Hall on North Franklin St. on the edge of Storyville. He kept the name "Tuxedo" for the name of the band after the Dance Hall closed. Dressing the band in tuxedos, the Tuxedo became one of the most popular bands hired for society functions, both black and white. For years, Celestin co-led the Tuxedo Band with trombonist William Ridgely. They made their first recordings with the band during the Okeh Records field trip to New Orleans in 1925. Shortly after Ridgely and Celestin had a falling out and for about 5 years led competing "Tuxedo" bands. Celestin's Original Tuxedo Orchestra made an additional series of recordings for Columbia Records through the rest of the 1920s. In addition to the Tuxedo Orchestra, Celestin led the Tuxedo Brass Band, one of the top brass bands in the city. Such notables through the years as trombonist Bill Mathews, pianist Octave Crosby, drummer Christopher Goldston, cornetist Joe Oliver, trumpeter Mutt Carey, clarinetist Alphonse Picou, bassist Ricard Alexis and trumpeter Louis Armstrong played in the Original Tuxedo Orchestra with Celestin.

In 1932 Celestin was forced out of the business by the effects of the Great Depression, working in a shipyard until he was able to form a new band after the World War II. The new Tuxedo Brass Band proved tremendously popular and was hailed as a key New Orleans tourist attraction. In 1953, Papa Celestin appeared leading his band in the travelogue Cinerama Holiday, not released until 1955. His band became a regular feature at the Paddock Lounge on Bourbon Street in the French Quarter, and made regular radio broadcasts, television appearance, and more recordings. In 1953 Celestin gave a command performance for President Eisenhower at the White House. His last recording was "Marie LaVeau" (1954) on which he sang.

In view of the contribution Celestin made in jazz throughout his lifetime, the Jazz Foundation of New Orleans had a bust made and donated to the Delgado Museum in New Orleans. Near the end of his life, he was honored as one of the greats of New Orleans music. 4,000 people marched in his funeral parade when he died in 1954. After his death, Tuxedo Brass Band leadership was briefly taken over by trombonist Eddie Pierson until his death in 1958. The leadership of the band then fell to banjo player Albert "Papa" French.

Selective discography

Celestin recorded for Okeh in 1925, then for Columbia for the rest of the decade. He resumed recording in his final decade.  A number of air-checks from Celestin's radio broadcasts have also been issued commercially.

References

American jazz cornetists
American jazz trumpeters
American male trumpeters
Jazz musicians from New Orleans
1884 births
1954 deaths
Dixieland trumpeters
Dixieland cornetists
Okeh Records artists
Columbia Records artists
People from Napoleonville, Louisiana
20th-century trumpeters
20th-century American male musicians
American male jazz musicians
Tuxedo Brass Band members
Southland Records artists
20th-century African-American musicians